Icteranthidium laterale, the lateral-spotted yellow-resin bee, is a species of bee from the family Megachilidae. 
4e 
The origin of the name is from Latin "lateralis" meaning "concerning the side, side-", referring to the yellow patches on the sides of the abdomen. The habitat of the species is areas with a steppe character, and dry and warm locations, from the plains up to the mountain altitude.

They nest in cavities in the ground. A nest contains up to one dozen brood cells made entirely of resin. Their flight period is one generation from June to September.

References 

  

Megachilidae
Insects described in 1809